The 2022 ICC Men's T20 World Cup was the eighth ICC Men's T20 World Cup tournament. It was played in Australia from 16 October to 13 November 2022. In the final, England beat Pakistan by five wickets to win their second ICC Men's T20 World Cup title. Sam Curran was named the Player of the match and also the Player of the tournament.

Although originally scheduled to be held in 2020, the International Cricket Council (ICC) postponed the tournament because of the COVID-19 pandemic, with the re-arranged tournament held in Australia in 2022. The host nation were also the defending champions.

The host cities for matches were Adelaide, Brisbane, Geelong, Hobart, Melbourne, Perth and Sydney. The semi-finals took place at the Sydney Cricket Ground where Pakistan beat New Zealand by seven wickets, and at the Adelaide Oval where England beat India by ten wickets.

A series of global qualifying matches took place for the right to play in the group stages of the tournament, with the two best placed teams from the groups entering the Super 12 stage, to compete alongside eight pre-qualified nations.

Background 
In April 2018, the ICC announced that the tournament would replace the scheduled 2021 ICC Champions Trophy. This was after the ICC granted full international status to Twenty20 matches played between member sides from 1 January 2019 onwards.

In October 2019, it was reported that the ICC could scrap the T20 World Cup Qualifier, which would have been used as a pathway for qualification to the T20 World Cup. Therefore, twelve teams from the 2020 ICC T20 World Cup and four teams from qualification events would advance to the T20 World Cup. On 23 January 2020, the ICC confirmed the full details of qualification for the tournament. In May 2020, the ICC told the Board of Control for Cricket in India (BCCI) that they reserve the rights to take away hosting rights from India, after the BCCI did not secure a tax exemption from the Indian government for the tournament.

In July 2020, when the previous edition of the tournament was being reviewed due to the COVID-19 pandemic, Earl Eddings, the chairman of Cricket Australia suggested that Australia could host that tournament in October 2021, and India stage this tournament a year later in 2022. The ICC also confirmed that either Australia or India, the hosts for the tournaments originally scheduled to take place in 2020 and 2021 respectively, would host this tournament.

Several warm-up matches were played between 10 and 19 October 2022 between all participants. The first set of matches featured the teams from the groups in the first round of the main tournament, before the teams in the Super 12 phase played their warm-up matches. These matches did not have either T20I or T20 status as teams were allowed to field all 15 members of their squad.

Teams and qualifications 
The twelve teams that reached the Super 12 phase of the 2021 ICC Men's T20 World Cup automatically qualified for the 2022 tournament. Afghanistan, Australia, Bangladesh, England, India, Pakistan, New Zealand and South Africa all qualified directly for the Super 12 phase of this tournament, based on their performances in the 2021 tournament and their rankings as of 15 November 2021. Namibia, Scotland, Sri Lanka and the West Indies were all placed in the group stage of the competition.

The remaining four places came from the top two teams from each of the two Global Qualifiers. The Global Qualifiers had a total of sixteen teams; the bottom four teams from the 2021 ICC Men's T20 World Cup (Ireland, Netherlands, Oman and Papua New Guinea), the next four highest ranked T20I sides (Zimbabwe, Nepal, the United Arab Emirates and Singapore), and the eight teams that progressed from the Regional Finals. From the Global Qualifier A tournament, Ireland and the United Arab Emirates progressed to the T20 World Cup. The United Arab Emirates won the Global Qualifier A to be placed in Group A of the T20 World Cup, with Ireland placed in Group B. From the Global Qualifier B tournament, the Netherlands and Zimbabwe became the final two teams to qualify for the T20 World Cup. Zimbabwe won the Global Qualifier B tournament to be placed in Group B of the T20 World Cup, with the Netherlands being placed in Group A.

Global Qualifiers 
The Global Qualifiers comprised the four lowest-ranked teams from the 2021 ICC T20 World Cup, the four best-ranked teams not already qualified for the World Cup or qualifiers; and eight teams from Regional Qualifiers. On 24 March 2020, the International Cricket Council (ICC) confirmed that all ICC qualifying events scheduled to take place before 30 June 2020 had been postponed due to the COVID-19 pandemic. In December 2020, the ICC updated the qualification pathway following the disruption from the pandemic.

In August 2021, the ICC confirmed that the EAP qualifier had been cancelled due to the COVID-19 pandemic. As a result, the Philippines advanced to the Global Qualifiers as the highest-ranked team in the EAP region. In October 2021, Group B of the Asia qualifier was also cancelled due to the pandemic, with Hong Kong progressing as the highest-ranked team. In the Regional Final of the European qualifier, Jersey won their first four matches to confirm their progression to the Global Qualifiers. Germany finished in second place, ahead of Italy on net run rate, to also advance from the European group. Bahrain won Group A of the Asia qualifier, finishing just ahead of Qatar on net run rate. In the Americas qualifier, the United States became the first team from that group to reach the Global Qualifiers, after they won their first five matches. They were joined by Canada, who finished in second position in the Americas qualifier group. Uganda claimed the final place in the Global Qualifiers, after winning the Regional Final of the Africa qualifier.

Match officials 
On 3 October 2022, the ICC named the match referees and the umpires for the group stage of the tournament. On 7 November 2022, the ICC confirmed the match referees and the umpires for the semi-finals, with the officials for the final being named after the semi-finals.

Match referees
  David Boon
  Chris Broad
  Ranjan Madugalle
  Andy Pycroft

Umpires

  Chris Brown
  Aleem Dar
  Kumar Dharmasena
  Marais Erasmus
  Chris Gaffaney
  Michael Gough
  Adrian Holdstock
  Richard Illingworth
  Richard Kettleborough
  Nitin Menon
  Ahsan Raza
  Paul Reiffel
  Langton Rusere
  Rod Tucker
  Joel Wilson
  Paul Wilson

Squads 

On 1 September 2022, Australia were the first team to announce their squad for the tournament. All the teams announced their preliminary squads by 22 September 2022.

Venues 
On 15 November 2021, the ICC confirmed the venues that would host matches across the tournament. The host cities were Adelaide, Brisbane, Geelong, Hobart, Melbourne, Perth and Sydney. The semi-finals took place at the Sydney Cricket Ground and the Adelaide Oval, with the final taking place at the Melbourne Cricket Ground.

Prize money 
On 30 September 2022, the ICC announced the prize money for the tournament.

Warm-up matches 
The following warm-up matches for the 2022 ICC Men's T20 World Cup were played between 10 and 19 October between all participants. The first set of matches featured the teams from the groups in the first round of the main tournament, before the teams in the Super 12 phase played their warm-up matches. These matches did not have either Twenty20 International (T20I) status or T20 status as teams were allowed to field all 15 members of their squad.

First round warm-ups

Super 12 warm-ups

First round 
On 21 March 2022, ICC confirmed the fixtures for the first round.

Group A

Group B

Super 12

Group 1

Group 2

Knockout stage

Semi-finals

Final 

Pakistan were asked to bat first who then scored a total of 137 runs for the fall of 8 wickets. Shan Masood was Pakistan's top scorer with 38 runs. England's Sam Curran finished with the figures of 3 wickets for 12 runs.

In the second innings, England finished the six-over powerplay with 49 runs for 3 wickets.
In the 13th over, the game changed when Shaheen Shah Afridi slid forwards to take a catch off Shadab Khan, dismissing Harry Brook. Shaheen jarred his right knee
in the process. With England needing 41 runs off five overs, Shaheen attempted to return for his third over after receiving some treatment. But he pulled out of his run-up once, then sent one down to Moeen Ali at 114 kph. Iftikhar Ahmed then completed Shaheen's remaining over after he took off the field. With scores level after Ben Stokes had brought up his maiden T20I fifty, he scored the winning run with six balls to spare.

Statistics 
The top five (or all those tied for fifth) in each category are listed.

Most runs

Most wickets

Team of the tournament 
On 14 November 2022, the ICC announced its team of the tournament with Sam Curran being named as player of the tournament, and Jos Buttler as the captain of the team.

Footnotes

References

External links 

 Series home at ESPN Cricinfo
 New Zealand vs Pakistan Semi Final Encounter, T20 World Cup semi-final: Pakistan defeated New Zealand by 7 wickets to enter the final

2022
2022 ICC Men's T20 World Cup
International cricket competitions in 2022–23
ICC Men's T20 World Cup 2022
International cricket competitions in Australia
ICC Men's T20 World Cup
ICC Men's T20 World Cup
2022 in Australian cricket
2022 in Australian sport